St Florentine was a 60-gun coast guard vessel in service in support of the French Navy during the early days of the Seven Years' War, before being captured by Britain in 1759 and commissioned into the Royal Navy as HMS St Florentine.

Surplus to Navy requirements by 1771, St Florentine was decommissioned and sunk as a breakwater off the port of Sheerness.

See also
List of ships captured in the 18th century

Notes

References

Lavery, Brian (2003) The Ship of the Line - Volume 1: The development of the battlefleet 1650-1850. Conway Maritime Press. .

Ships of the line of the French Navy
Ships of the line of the Royal Navy
Captured ships
Ships sunk as breakwaters